Jessica Naiga Ayebazibwe, (née Jessica Naiga), also Naiga Ayebazibwe, (1 January 1965 – 25 June 2018) was a Ugandan lawyer and judge who served as a justice of the High Court of Uganda, since 29 April 2014.

Background and education
She was born in Uganda and attended local schools for her primary and secondary education. She obtained a Bachelor of Laws degree, from Makerere University, Uganda's oldest and largest public university. She also held a Diploma in Legal Practice, awarded by the Law Development Centre in Kampala, the national capital and largest city in the country. She was a member of the Uganda Bar.

Career
Prior to her appointment to the high court, for the seven years from 2007 until 2014, she served as a legal officer at the Uganda National Environment Management Authority.

She began her legal career in 1992 as a legal assistant with Bazire D’bango and Company Advocates. When she left the law firm, she was hired by the national tax body, Uganda Revenue Authority. She served there for about 10 years as a revenue officer.

After her appointment to the high court, she was assigned to the Family Division of the court.

Personal life
Lady Justice Jessica Naiga Ayebazibwe was the mother of three children.

See also
 Julia Sebutinde
 Catherine Bamugemereire

References

External links
 Justice Jessica Naiga Dies at Her Home As of 25 June 2018.

1965 births
2018 deaths
Ganda people
20th-century Ugandan lawyers
21st-century Ugandan judges
Ugandan women judges
Makerere University alumni
Law Development Centre alumni
People from Central Region, Uganda
Justices of the High Court of Uganda
21st-century women judges